Nupserha vitticollis is a species of beetle in the family Cerambycidae. It was described by Hermann Julius Kolbe in 1893. It is known from Tanzania, the Democratic Republic of the Congo, Cameroon, Uganda, and Togo.

Varietas
 Nupserha vitticollis var. elongata (Kolbe, 1893)
 Nupserha vitticollis var. camerunica (Aurivillius, 1914)
 Nupserha vitticollis var. gaskini (Villiers, 1941)
 Nupserha vitticollis var. pseudofrontalis Breuning, 1950
 Nupserha vitticollis var. insularis Breuning, 1950
 Nupserha vitticollis var. quadripunctulata Breuning, 1950
 Nupserha vitticollis var. holoxantha (Aurivillius, 1914)

References

vitticollis
Beetles described in 1893
Taxa named by Hermann Julius Kolbe